Donnie Kirkpatrick is an American football coach. He is currently the offensive coordinator and quarterbacks coach at East Carolina University, a position he has held since 2019. It is his second stint at East Carolina, having previously served as the wide receivers coach at ECU from 2005 to 2015. Kirkpatrick served as head football coach at the University of Tennessee at Chattanooga for three seasons, from 2000 to 2002.  His coaching career has also included stops at Appalachian State, South Carolina, Eastern Michigan, Louisville, Western Carolina, and James Madison.

Playing career
Kirkpatrick was a four-year letterwinner for the Lenoir-Rhyne Bears football team from 1978 to 1981. He played quarterback for three years and wide receiver for one. He was also a letterwinner in tennis for the Bears.

Coaching career

Appalachian State
From 1984 to 1988, Kirkpatrick served as a graduate assistant for Appalachian State where he worked with the quarterbacks, running backs, and defensive ends. During his time in Boone, North Carolina, Kirkpatrick was a part of two SoCon championships in 1986 and in 1987.

South Carolina
In 1989, Kirkpatrick joined Sparky Woods' staff at South Carolina as the quarterbacks coach and recruiting coordinator. He was there through the 1992 season and coached Todd Ellis and Bobby Fuller.

Eastern Michigan
In 1993 and 1994, Kirkpatrick was on Ron Cooper’s staff at Eastern Michigan. In 1993, he coached the wide receivers, before being promoted to assistant head coach, and coaching the quarterbacks and running backs. Here, he coached Charlie Batch, who became a second round selection in the NFL draft.

Louisville
In 1995, Kirkpatrick followed Cooper to Louisville as the offensive coordinator and quarterbacks coach. He was directly responsible for developing quarterback Chris Redman into a third round NFL selection.

Chattanooga
Following his stint at Louisville, Kirkpatrick moved to Chattanooga. In 1998, he was a volunteer assistant, working with the defensive backs. The following year, he became the offensive coordinator. After an offensive record-setting year, Kirkpatrick was promoted to head coach.

In Kirkpatrick's first season at the helm, the team was 5–6 and 3–5 in conference play. In his second year, the team was 3-8, and 1-7 in the conference. In his third and final year, Kirkpatrick's team was 4–8, and 2–6 within the conference.

With two games remaining in the 2002 season, Chattanooga announced that they would be reassigning Kirkpatrick at the conclusion of the season, and would hire a new football coach.

Western Carolina
Instead of being reassigned, Kirkpatrick left to take a job at Western Carolina. He was the wide receivers for the 2003 and 2004 seasons.

East Carolina (first stint)
From 2005 through 2015, Kirkpatrick tutored the East Carolina wide receivers. He coached three players that would be drafted to play in the NFL. They were: Justin Hardy, Dwayne Harris, and Aundrae Allison.

James Madison
From 2016 to 2018, Kirkpatrick served as the offensive coordinator on Mike Houston’s staff at James Madison. James Madison won the 2016 FCS National Championship.

East Carolina (second stint)
When Mike Houston became the head coach of the East Carolina Pirates football team in December 2018, he announced that many of his staff members at James Madison would be coming with him, including Donnie Kirkpatrick.

Personal life
Kirkpatrick and his wife, Misty (McReery), have two children: a daughter, Molly, and a son, Davis. Davis was a pitcher on the East Carolina Pirates baseball team from 2014 to 2018.

Kirkpatrick is a product of South Caldwell High School in Hudson, North Carolina, where he played quarterback for his father, Don Kirkpatrick. He led SCHS to the state championship final in his senior year.

Head coaching record

References

External links
 East Carolina profile

1959 births
Living people
American football quarterbacks
American football wide receivers
Appalachian State Mountaineers football coaches
Chattanooga Mocs football coaches
Eastern Michigan Eagles football coaches
James Madison Dukes football coaches
Lenoir–Rhyne Bears football players
Louisville Cardinals football coaches
South Carolina Gamecocks football coaches
Western Carolina Catamounts football coaches
People from Caldwell County, North Carolina
Coaches of American football from North Carolina
Players of American football from North Carolina